
Gmina Nurzec-Stacja is a rural gmina (administrative district) in Siemiatycze County, Podlaskie Voivodeship, in north-eastern Poland, on the border with Belarus.

Villages
Gmina Nurzec-Stacja contains the villages and settlements of Anusin, Augustynka, Borysowszczyzna, Chanie, Chursy, Dąbrowa Leśna, Gajówka, Grabarka, Grabarka-Klasztor, Klukowicze, Klukowicze-Kolonia, Litwinowicze, Moszczona Pańska, Nurczyk, Nurczyk-Kolonia, Nurzec, Nurzec-Kisielewo, Nurzec-Kolonia, Nurzec-Stacja, Piszczatka, Siemichocze, Sokóle, Stołbce, Sycze, Szumiłówka, Tartak, Telatycze, Tymianka, Wakułowicze, Werpol, Wólka Nurzecka, Wyczółki, Zabłocie, Zalesie and Żerczyce.

Neighbouring gminas
Gmina Nurzec-Stacja is bordered by the gminas of Czeremcha, Mielnik, Milejczyce and Siemiatycze. It also borders Belarus.

References
Polish official population figures 2006

Nurzec-Stacja
Gmina Nurzec Stacja